Mirosław Turko (2 October 1918 – 29 September 1981) was a Polish - Ukrainian football striker and coach.

He was born in Mostyska, then Austro-Hungary. He played for Ukrainian Sports Club Sian Przemyśl from 1934-1939, Rapid Vienna from c. 1940 to 1945 and then Spartak Lviv from 1945-1949 and finally OBO Lviv from 1949, where ended his playing career and became a coach for them for many years. He also managed FC Avanhard Ternopil. He died on September 29, 1981 in Lviv.

References

1918 births
1981 deaths
Polish footballers
Ukrainian footballers
Soviet footballers
SKA Lviv players
SK Rapid Wien players
People from Mostyska
People from the Kingdom of Galicia and Lodomeria
Ukrainian Austro-Hungarians
Ukrainian football managers
Soviet football managers
SKA Lviv managers
FC Avanhard Ternopil managers
Association footballers not categorized by position
Sian Przemyśl players
Sportspeople from Lviv Oblast